All Saints Catholic Secondary School is a secondary school located in Whitby, Ontario, Canada open for students in grades 7–12. It offers a broad range of academic programs including Ontario Youth Apprenticeship Program (OYAP), Cooperative Education  (Co-Op), Specialist High Skills Major (SHSM), Advanced Placement (AP), Head Start, Centre for Success/Reconnect, and Electronic learning. It is adjacent to Donald A Wilson Secondary School.

Notable alumni 
Zack Greer, lacrosse player
James Neal, NHL hockey player
Cole Perfetti, NHL hockey player

See also
List of high schools in Ontario

References

External links 
Official web site
Profile at the Ontario Ministry of Education web site
Profile at the Education Quality and Accountability Office web site

Educational institutions established in 2001
High schools in the Regional Municipality of Durham
Education in Whitby, Ontario
2001 establishments in Ontario
Art schools in Canada
Catholic secondary schools in Ontario